Nuria Fernandez may refer to:

 Nuria I. Fernandez (born 1959), a United States transit official born in Panama
 Nuria Fernández Domínguez (born 1976), a Spanish middle-distance runner
 Nuria Fernández Gómez (born 1979), better known as Nuria Fergó or simply Fergó, a Spanish actress and singer